Ruston is a small city and the parish seat of Lincoln Parish, Louisiana, United States. It is the largest city in the Eastern Ark-La-Tex region, with a 2020 population of 22,166. Ruston is near the eastern border of the Ark-La-Tex region and is the home of Louisiana Tech University. Ruston is the principal city of the Ruston micropolitan statistical area, which includes all of Lincoln Parish.

History 
During the Reconstruction Era following the Civil War, word soon reached the young parish near what is now Ruston, that the Vicksburg, Shreveport, and Pacific Railroad would begin to run across north Louisiana, linking the Deep South with the West (the current operator is Kansas City Southern Railway). Robert Edwin Russ, the Lincoln Parish sheriff from 1877–1880, donated  to the town and this area was eventually known as Ruston (shorthand for Russ town).

In 1883, commercial and residential lots were created and sold for $375 apiece; and soon the sawing of lumber and clacking of hammers could be heard throughout the area.

As the town began to take shape, new churches, businesses, civic organizations and schools were being established. Cotton farming fueled the economy. In 1900 a second railroad, running north and south, was built through Ruston (the operator before the tracks were removed was Chicago, Rock Island and Pacific Railroad). This brought even more business and industry to the area and the population continued to provide a foundation for the local economy. By the time the U.S. entered World War I in 1917, Ruston was established as a center for learning, a place of civic pride and as an area of economic prosperity throughout the region.

1938 also exposed a dark side of Ruston for which it received national attention when an African-American teenager named R.C. Williams was lynched in one of the most brutal attacks of its type in many years.  19 year old Williams was accused by a mob of vigilantes of killing a white man and assaulting a white woman, although it was later determined to be highly unlikely that Williams was guilty of these, or any other crimes.  The vigilantes captured Williams and after torturing him with red-hot pokers (castration was also suspected) and shooting him numerous times, he was hung from a tree.   Although a local sheriff tried to stop the mob, they then threatened the sheriff with his own life, and the lynching continued.  A grand jury of all white men later cleared all of the perpetuators of any wrong doing.  The crime had a significant and long lasting impact on state and national politics, and can be directly related to the rise of segregationist demagoguery in the south.

Ruston grew steadily during the post-World War II years. The GI Bill of Rights sent war veterans to college, helped to fuel the local economy, brought growth to the two local universities, Louisiana Tech University and nearby historically black Grambling State University, and new families moved into Lincoln Parish. By the middle 1960s, Interstate 20 passed through the northern part of Ruston. This major interstate highway made Ruston more easily accessible, much as the railroad had done a century earlier. In the 1980s, the state of Louisiana economy declined as the oil industry went into a recession.

Ruston, however, continued growing steadily because of the rapid expansion of Louisiana Tech. The city also had its centennial celebration during this decade, and emphasis was placed on revitalizing the historic downtown district. A joint effort between the city and the Louisiana Main Street Program and the Louisiana Department of Historic Preservation brought forth  beautification projects to rehabilitate the downtown district, and helped draw the community closer to its roots. More than fifteen buildings have been placed on the National Register of Historic Places.

The city has a new general aviation airport to serve existing business and industry, and the timber, poultry and cattle industries continue to expand.

The Arkansas Southern Railroad Company (ASRR), that became the Chicago, Rock Island and Pacific Railway (CRI&P), built a station named Chautauqua, north of Ruston that became part of the town.

Geography

Climate

Demographics 

According to the 2020 United States census, there were 22,166 people, 7,970 households, and 3,938 families residing in the city. In 2010, there were 21,859 people in the city; according to the census of 2000,  there were 20,546 people, 7,621 households, and 4,244 families residing in the city with a population density of 1,136.4 people per square mile (438.8/km).

In 2000, the racial makeup of the city was 56.94% White, 38.92% African American, 0.17% Native American, 2.41% Asian, 0.02% Pacific Islander, 0.63% from other races, and 0.90% from two or more races. Hispanic or Latino of any race were 1.29% of the population. By 2020, the racial makeup of the city was 50.53% non-Hispanic white, 40% African American, 0.39% Native American, 2.49% Asian, 0.02% Pacific Islander, 3.13% two or more races, and 3.44% Hispanic or Latino of any race.

According to the 2000 census, the median income for a household in the city was $23,001, and the median income for a family was $37,394. Males had a median income of $33,408 versus $20,413 for females. The per capita income for the city was $14,573. About 22.1% of families and 32.1% of the population were below the poverty line, including 34.1% of those under age 18 and 17.6% of those age 65 or over. At the publication of the 2020 census, the median household income grew to $34,554.

Arts and culture  

Most cultural activities are offered through Louisiana Tech. Also there are shops downtown, chain restaurants in the city, and an eight-screen Celebrity Theater. Other university-based opportunities exist at Grambling (6 miles from Ruston) and Monroe (35 miles away). The Louisiana Tech University Arboretum interests many visitors.
 
Early in 2007, the city initiated a blueprint for future growth and development of the Ruston area. Known as "Ruston 21", the plan will evaluate the assets of the community and the ways to achieve goals. It will look citywide at residential development and neighborhoods, recreation planning, transportation issues, economic development, infrastructure concerns, quality of life, and working collaboratively with Louisiana Tech University.

Opened in 1928, the historic Dixie Theater serves as the visual and performing arts hub of Ruston as it houses the North Central Louisiana Arts Council, Piney Hills Gallery, Ruston Community Theatre, Ruston Civic Symphony Society, Troupe Dixie, independent film screenings, dance recitals, and music concerts. Celebrity Theatres, an eight-screen movie theater with digital projection and sound with 3D capabilities and stadium seating in all auditoriums, opened in Ruston in 2006. On campus at Louisiana Tech, Howard Auditorium and Stone Theatre serve as the university's home for the performing arts, and Louisiana Tech is home to two visual art galleries including the E. J. Bellocq Gallery and the Louisiana Tech Art Gallery.

The Louisiana Military Museum features uniforms, weapons, flags, training gear, aircraft, and vehicles from nearly every conflict in United States history. Built in 1886, the Kidd-Davis house is home to the Lincoln Parish Museum, which exhibits early Ruston history. Located on Louisiana Tech's main campus, The Idea Place Math and Science Discovery Center offers many interactive science exhibits including a planetarium.

Ruston is located in the heart of North Louisiana, known as the Sportsman's Paradise, where outdoor activities like hunting and fishing are popular for residents. Located on the Louisiana Tech campus, Garland Gregory Hideaway Park has a seven-acre lake for fishing and canoeing, walking/running trails, pavilions, grills, ropes course, and an 18-hole frisbee golf course. The North Louisiana Exhibition Center hosts rodeos, barrel races, horse and livestock shows, roping events, and antique car and tractor shows in Ruston.

As home to the Louisiana Tech Bulldogs and Lady Techsters of Conference USA, Ruston is a scene of major college sports. The Louisiana Tech Bulldogs football team plays at Joe Aillet Stadium and has won three national championships, won 25 conference championships, and played in 24 postseason games including nine major college bowl games. The Louisiana Tech Bulldogs basketball and Louisiana Tech Lady Techsters basketball teams play their games at the Thomas Assembly Center. The Dunkin' Dawgs have won 25 regular season conference championships, made seven NCAA Tournament appearances including one Sweet Sixteen, and nine NIT appearances. The Lady Techsters have won three national championships and 20 regular season conference championships; have competed in 13 Final Fours, 23 Sweet Sixteens, and 27 NCAA Tournaments; and have the second most wins all-time of any women's college basketball program. The Louisiana Tech Bulldogs baseball team plays at J. C. Love Field at Pat Patterson Park, has won 21 regular season conference championships, and has participated in eight NCAA Tournaments.

Peach Festival 

Each June, Ruston hosts its annual Peach Festival, sponsored by the Squire Creek Country Club.

Until the 1940s, most area peach farming had been done on a small-scale family basis. In 1947, area peach growers organized the Louisiana Fruit Growers Association and held the first festival four years later on June 27–28, 1951. On that occasion, Justin Wilson, the popular south Louisiana chef and Cajun humorist entertained the audience at Howard Auditorium on the Louisiana Tech campus. Then State Senator Dudley J. LeBlanc of Abbeville in Vermilion Parish, the promoter of the patent medicine known as Hadacol, was invited to crown the first Peach Festival Queen, Ann Colvin of Bernice in Union Parish.

The festival sponsors races of 5K and 1M and a tennis tournament played on the Louisiana Tech courts.

Railroad Fest 
Railroad Fest is an annual makers, music, and culture festival held in Downtown Ruston each April since 2017. The Makers Fair is held at the Historic Ruston Fire Station, and live music is performed at the amphitheater at Railroad Park.

Education

Primary and secondary education 

Public schools are part of the Lincoln Parish School System. Eight of the twelve Lincoln Parish Schools are located in Ruston. Lincoln Parish Early Childhood Center operates the parish's preschool program in Ruston. Glen View Elementary School and Hillcrest Elementary School teach kindergarten through the second grade. Cypress Springs Elementary School and Ruston Elementary School teach third grade through fifth grade. I. A. Lewis School teaches only sixth grade, and Ruston Junior High School teaches seventh and eighth grades. Ruston High School teaches ninth through twelfth grades.

Located on Louisiana Tech's campus in Ruston, A. E. Phillips Laboratory School offers kindergarten through eighth grade.

Ruston is home to a few private schools. Cedar Creek School and Bethel Christian School are college preparatory schools that offer preschool through twelfth grade. New Living Word School also offers preschool through twelfth grade. Montessori School of Ruston offers preschool through eighth grade.

Lorraine Nobles Howard Education Center, known as Howard School, is an alternative school for the residents of the Louisiana Methodist Children's Home in Ruston.

Higher education 

Louisiana Tech University, a national research university, dominates the city of Ruston, providing the city with its distinctive college town character. Grambling State University is located in nearby Grambling, only four miles west of the Louisiana Tech campus. Additionally, Louisiana Delta Community College has a branch campus located in Ruston.

Media 

The Ruston Daily Leader is the newspaper serving Ruston and the rest of Lincoln Parish since 1894. The Daily Leader is published Sunday morning and Monday through Friday afternoons. Louisiana Tech University is served by several publications including The Tech Talk, the independent Louisiana Tech student newspaper that reports on local, state, and national issues in addition to campus news.
The only AM radio station based in Ruston is KRUS 1490, a gospel music station.

FM

Infrastructure
The 527th Engineer Battalion (Triple Alpha) ("Anything, Anytime, Anywhere") is headquartered in Ruston. This battalion is part of the 225th Engineer Brigade of the Louisiana National Guard.

Notable people 
 Trace Adkins, country singer who attended Louisiana Tech; originally from Sarepta
 Leon Barmore, Hall of Fame NCAA basketball coach, played basketball at Louisiana Tech and Ruston High School
 George W. Bond, president of Louisiana Tech University from 1929 to 1936
 Terry Bradshaw, member of the Pro Football Hall of Fame, attended Louisiana Tech
 Kix Brooks, country music singer, who attended Louisiana Tech.
 P.J. Brown, retired NBA player, attended Louisiana Tech
 Mary Elizabeth Talbot Busbee, the First Lady of Georgia from 1975 to 1983, was born and reared in Ruston. Known as "Mary Beth", she was a medical technologist and a graduate of Louisiana Tech. Her husband was the late Democratic Governor George D. Busbee.
 John R. Conniff, educator, president of Louisiana Tech from 1926 to 1928
 Martie Cordaro, president and general manager of the Omaha Storm Chasers baseball club
 Fred Dean, NFL Hall of Famer, attended Ruston High and Louisiana Tech
 Clarence Faulk, newspaper publisher, radio broadcaster, businessman
 Tim Floyd, NCAA and NBA basketball coach, attended Louisiana Tech
 Vic Frazier, MLB pitcher from early 20th century
 W. C. Friley, founder of Ruston College in the late 1880s, a forerunner of Louisiana Tech; later president of Hardin–Simmons University in Abilene, Texas, and Louisiana College in Pineville, succeeded there in 1910 by Claybrook Cottingham
 Ralph Garr, former Major League Baseball player and member of the Atlanta Braves Hall of Fame attended Lincoln High School
 Andy Hamilton, NFL player
 Aaron Holiday, NBA player for the Atlanta Hawks
 Will Cullen Hart, indie rock musician, visual artist, and founding member of the Elephant Six Collective and The Olivia Tremor Control, and leader of Circulatory System, attended Ruston High School and was a disc jockey at Louisiana Tech's radio station KLPI
 Sonja Hogg, founding coach of the Louisiana Tech Lady Techsters
 Bert Jones, former NFL quarterback, attended Ruston High School
 Dub Jones, former NFL halfback, attended Ruston High School
 Karl Malone, Basketball Hall of Famer, attended Louisiana Tech, currently lives in Ruston
 Jeff Mangum, indie rock musician and founding member of the Elephant Six Collective and Neutral Milk Hotel, attended Ruston High School and was a disc jockey at Louisiana Tech's radio station KLPI
 Monica Maxwell, former WNBA player 1999-2002, played in 2 Final Fours for the Lady Techsters 1998, 1999
 Luke McCown, former NFL quarterback, attended Louisiana Tech
 Garnie W. McGinty, Louisiana historian
 Paul Millsap, current NBA player, attended Louisiana Tech
 Ryan Moats, athlete, attended Louisiana Tech
 Kim Mulkey, head women's basketball coach of LSU Tigers
 Virgil Orr, former state representative; Louisiana Tech vice president
 Joe Raymond Peace, former football coach of Louisiana Tech Bulldogs and Ruston resident
 Arthur T. Prescott, educator and founding president from 1894 to 1899 of Louisiana Tech University
 Patrick Ramsey, former NFL quarterback, attended Ruston High School
 Willie Roaf, NFL Hall of Fame player, attended Louisiana Tech
 Kramer Robertson, current MLB player for St. Louis Cardinals
 Scotty Robertson, high school, college, and professional basketball coach, died in Ruston in 2011
 W. C. Robinson, mathematics professor and second president of Louisiana Tech from 1899 to 1900
 Robert Schneider, Indie rock musician, record producer, founding member of the Elephant Six Collective, and frontman of The Apples in Stereo, attended Ruston High School
 Josh Scobee, current NFL player, attended Louisiana Tech
 John Simoneaux, blues singer, songwriter, and guitarist, graduate of LA Tech; memorial jam held in his memory annually to raise scholarship money
 Mickey Slaughter, former NFL quarterback, attended and later coached football for, Louisiana Tech
 Polly Smith, photographer
 George Stone, former National League pitcher with the Atlanta Braves and New York Mets.
 Scotty Thurman, former basketball player, attended Arkansas, made the game winning shot in the 1994 NCAA National Championship against Duke, attended Ruston High School
 A. L. Williams, retired football coach
 Kyle Williams, former NFL player, attended Ruston High School
 Clint Williamson, US Ambassador, White House policy official, and international prosecutor
 John D. Winters, historian of the American Civil War
 Kenny Wright, former NFL defensive back (Minnesota Vikings 1999–2001, Houston Texans 2002–2004, Jacksonville Jaguars 2005, Washington Redskins 2006 and Cleveland Browns 2007)

In popular culture

 Jack Kerouac refers to Ruston in his book On the Road.
 Indie rock band Neutral Milk Hotel was formed in Ruston.
 The longstanding Dixie Theater in Ruston is featured in a 1999 article in the publication North Louisiana History.
 Ruston is also the hometown of Robert Schneider, frontman of The Apples in Stereo. He attended Ruston High School.
 Ruston is mentioned several times in the HBO series True Blood.  A vampire on the series is seen wearing a Louisiana Tech Bulldogs sweatshirt.
Social media personality Logan Paul acted as "mayor" of Ruston for two days for his online streaming show Logan Paul VS...
 Ruston was featured in a first season episode of HBO's We're Here.

Notes

References

External links 

 City of Ruston
 Ruston-Lincoln Convention And Visitors Bureau

 
Cities in Louisiana
Cities in the Ark-La-Tex
Cities in Lincoln Parish, Louisiana
Parish seats in Louisiana
Cities in Ruston, Louisiana micropolitan area
County seats in the Ark-La-Tex
1885 establishments in Louisiana